= Galveston (textile factory) =

Textile factory in Belgium

Coordinates: 51.0742°N 3.7232°E

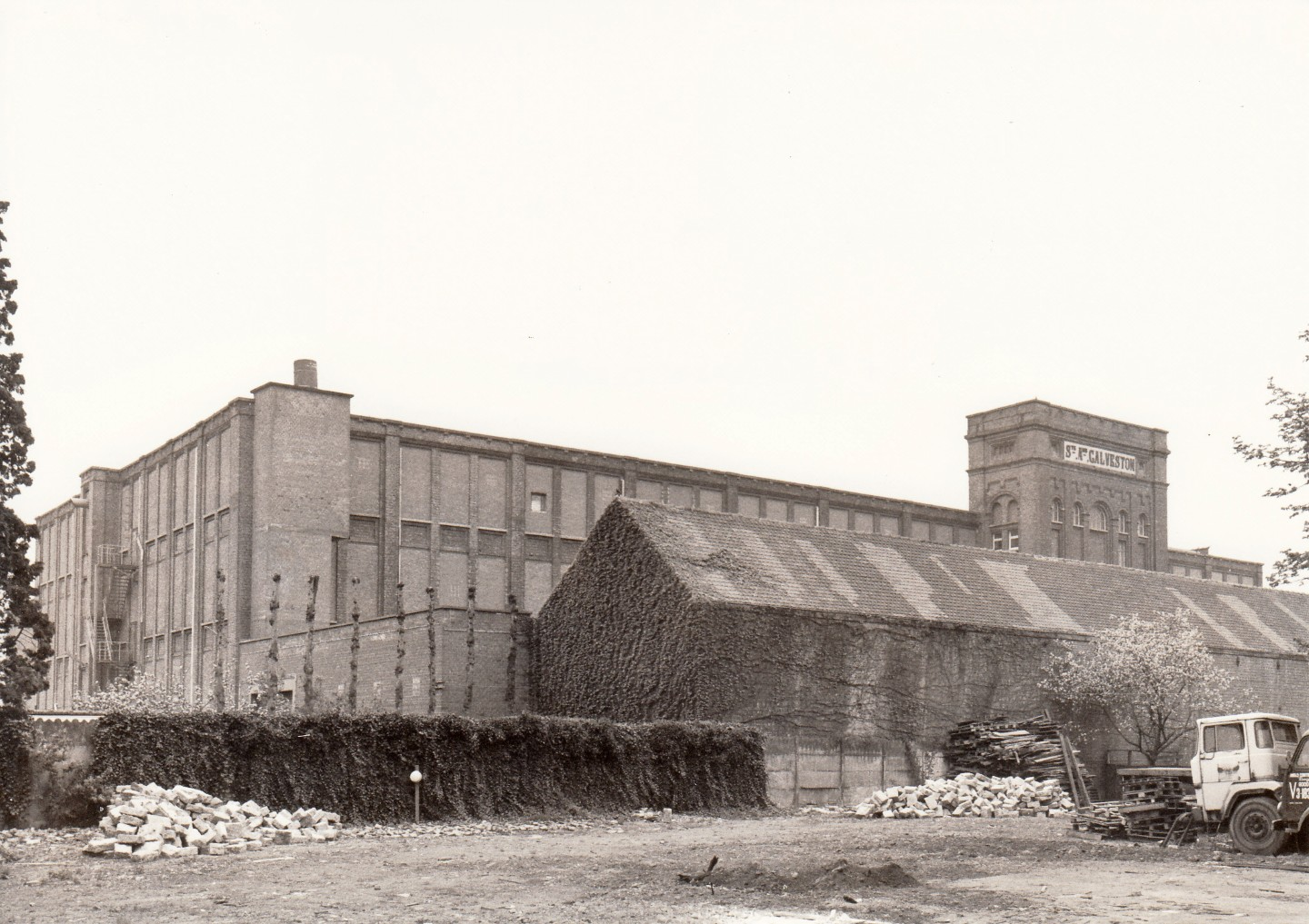

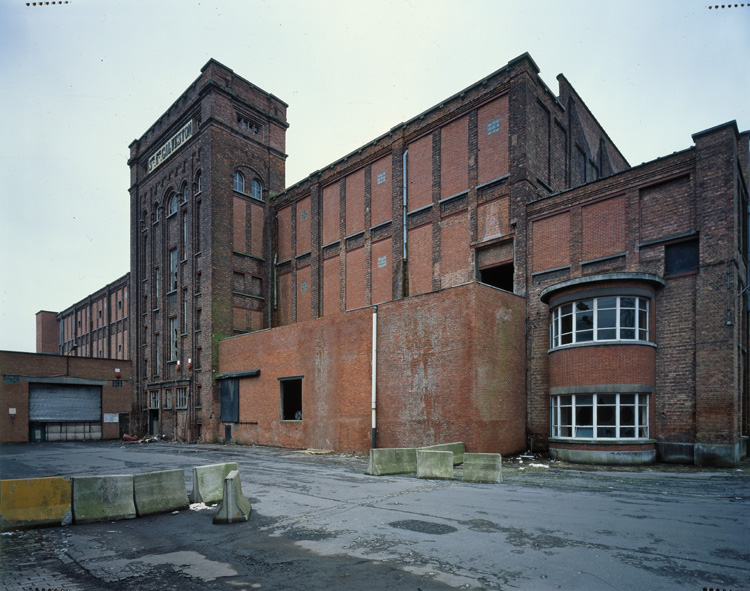
UCO Galveston front view

UCO Galveston was a cotton spinning mill in Ghent, located at Wiedauwkaai 52 (formerly: Nijverheidskaai). It was also known as NV Galveston or Cotonnière Galveston.

== History ==
The Societé Anonyme Cotonnière Galveston was founded in 1910 by Emile Braun and Adolphe Hebbelynck, who were also the first managing directors of the firm. Production started in 1912. Its name 'Galveston', which can be seen on the tower façade, refers to the port town in Texas (United States) from where tons of raw cotton were shipped to Europe.

As of 1919, the factory was part of Union Cotonnière, a consortium of six cotton spinning mills in Ghent. In 1967 four warehouses from across the street became part of the Galveston site. Two of them date back to the mid-19th century and belonged to the La Liève flax spinning mill, one of the most well-known spinning mills in Ghent.

The downfall of the Ghent textile industry led to the Galveston's closure in 1999. By then, the building had been used by UCO as a warehouse for some time already. The building's staircase and water tower were classified as a protected monument in 2002. The rest of the site also remained intact and was catalogued as architectural heritage. The warehouse belonging to the former La Liève spinning mill also received the status of protected monument in 2002.

In 2003, a firm specialised in industrial cleaning acquired the Galveston site and relocated its headquarters there. The rest of the buildings were redeveloped to accommodate companies and recreation. Since 2006, an event hall, a boxing club, an indoor playground, a dance studio and a rooftop restaurant can be found in the former factory building.

== Building ==
The Galveston building dates from 1910 and was designed by Ghent architect Emile De Weerdt. It displays the typical characteristics of a Manchester-style factory and has four building layers under a flat roof.
